Yerköprü Waterfall refers to:

Yerköprü Waterfall (Konya), a waterfall in Hadim district of Konya Province
Yerköprü Waterfall (Mersin), a waterfall in Mut district of Mersin Province